Kim Sung-woo is honorary poet and journalist of South Korea.

He joined the Hankook Ilbo and served as a Paris correspondent, Managing editor and standing advisor.
He is a journalist who has served in newspapers for 44 years.

He became the Korea's first Honorary Poets(Society of Korean Poets) for popularizing poetry recitation movements.
He is also the Korea's only Honorary Actor(National Theater Association of Korea Inc.,).
Currently, he is serving as a permanent executive director of JEI Culture Foundation.

Awards
1991 Culture Prize in Seoul
1992 Korean Culture & Arts Awards
1996 Order of Merit for France
1997 Samsung Press Awards
2010 Tongyeong Culture Awards
2016 The Bogwan Order of Culture Merit from the Korean Ministry of Culture and Tourism

Works list
1991 Into the Forest of Birch(백화나무 숲으로)
1994 The age of culture(문화의 시대)
1997 The Literary Travels Around the World(세계의 문학기행)
1997 The Music Travels Around the World(세계의 음악기행)
2000 Intellect travels of Paris(파리 지성기행)
2007 Life is a question(인생은 물음이다)
2011 A returning ship(돌아가는 배)
2018 Beyond the horizon(수평선 너머에서)

See also
Si-nangsong
Korean literature
List of Korean-language poets

References 

1934 births
Korean writers
South Korean journalists
Living people
People from Tongyeong